Caesar and Otto's Paranormal Halloween is a 2015 comedy-horror film. It is written and directed by Dave Campfield. And stars Dave Campfield, Paul Chomicki, Beverly Randolph, Felissa Rose, and Deron Miller. The film is also the first feature film for actresses' JamieLee Ackerman and Josephine Iannece. This film is the sixth film in the Caesar and Otto series.

The film had its world premiere on June 29, 2015 at the Florida Supercon where it won for best comedy.

Plot 
Half-brothers Caesar and Otto live out some of horror's most terrifying scenes when they agree to house-sit a home filled with ghostly visions, levitating objects and possessions. This hilarious horror pays homage to the classics, The Exorcist, The Amityville Horror, Sinister, Insidious, and more. Filled with an All-Star cast, and including the return of all of the favorite "Caesar and Otto" cast members.

Cast 
 Dave Campfield as Caesar Denovio
 Paul Chomicki as Otto Denovio
 Scott Aguilar as Fred Denovio 
 Deron Miller as Father Jason Steiger
 JamieLee Ackerman as Kyla
 Beverly Randolph as Shari Hartlin
 Brinke Stevens as Sashi
 Josephine Iannece as Gilda
 Ken Macfarlane as Jerry
 Samantha Barrios as Roberta
 Felissa Rose as Lakota
 Tiffany Shepis as Jamie tremain
 Andre Gower as Sam Wellner
 Vernon Wells as Guy Hunsinger
 Sean Whalen as Monsignor Winston

References

External links 
 Official website
 

2015 comedy horror films
2015 films
American comedy horror films
2015 comedy films
2010s American films